Two Sides to Every Story is a 1977 album by American singer-songwriter Gene Clark. The album was Clark's first release since his 1974 album No Other. Notable tracks include "In the Pines" (traditional), "Kansas City Southern" and "Hear the Wind", both written by Clark, and "Give My Love to Marie", a song written by James Talley that tells the story of a dying coal miner.

The album was produced by Thomas Jefferson Kaye. Guest musicians are Jeff Baxter, Emmylou Harris, Byron Berline, Al Perkins and John Hartford.

Reception

Music critic Matthew Greenwald, writing for AllMusic, said "the material is uneven, especially when Clark and the band try to rock out... But Clark's muse invariably guided him well even under awkward circumstances, and Two Sides has a number of superb moments... but if this is well short of a masterpiece, it's still clearly the work of a masterful singer and songwriter, and the best moments here are honestly magical." Hal Horowitz of American Songwriter wrote, "It's a low key yet delightfully straightforward set that even rocks out occasionally and showcases Clark's lovely understated vocals."

Reissue
In 2011 High Moon Records announced that the label would be reissuing the album. In early 2013 the label reissued a vinyl version of the album remastered by Dan Hersch and Doug Sax. The vinyl included a download card for bonus tracks. High Moon reissued the album on CD (soft independent release to fans) with extra photos and a pdf booklet with a new essay written by Tom Sandford, along with bonus tracks in the Spring of 2014. In November 2014, the release was expanded to major markets and distributed worldwide.

Track listing
All songs written by Gene Clark, except where noted.

2014 reissue downloadable bonus tracks

Personnel
Gene Clark – guitar, vocals
Jeff Baxter – guitar
Doug Dillard – banjo
Byron Berline – fiddle
Jim Fielder – bass
Mike Utley – keyboards
Jerry McGee – guitar
Al Perkins – guitar
Sammy Creason – drums
John Hartford – background vocals
Emmylou Harris – background vocals
Steven Soles – background vocals
Thomas Jefferson Kaye – background vocals
Daniel Moore – background vocals
Matthew Moore – background vocals
Pepper Watkins – background vocals
David Campbell – string arrangements

Production
Producer: Thomas Jefferson Kaye
Executive Producer: Gary Legon
Recording Engineer: Joel Soifer
Art Direction: Ed Caraeff
Photography: Ed Caraeff
Design: David Larkham

References

Gene Clark albums
1977 albums
Albums arranged by David Campbell (composer)
RSO Records albums